Tadao Nakamura (born 2 January 1947) is a Japanese professional golfer.

Nakamura played on the Japan Golf Tour, winning four times.

Professional wins (4)

Japan Golf Tour wins (4)

*Note: The 1990 Pepsi Ube Kosan Open was shortened to 54 holes due to rain.

External links

Japanese male golfers
Japan Golf Tour golfers
Sportspeople from Kanagawa Prefecture
1947 births
Living people